In the Latin script, pentagraphs are found primarily in Irish orthography. There is one archaic pentagraph in German orthography, which is found in the English words Nietzschean and derivatives (Nietzscheanism, Nietzscheanist, Nietzscheism, Nietzscheist).

Irish
Used between a velarized ("broad") and a palatalized ("slender") consonant:

 is used to write  

 is used to write 

 is used to write 

Used between a slender and a broad consonant:

 and  used to write  ( in Ulster) 

 is used to write  

 is used to write 

Used between two slender consonants:

Dutch
 is used as the transcription of the Cyrillic letter Щ, representing the consonant  in Russian, for example in the name Chroesjtsjov.

English 
 is used in the English names Gaughan and Vaughan to represent the sound /ɔː/.

French
 is used as the transcription of the Cyrillic letter Щ, representing the consonant  in Russian, for example in the name Khrouchtchev.

German
 was once used in German to write the sound . It has largely been replaced by the tetragraph , but is still found in proper names such as Tzschirner, Nietzsche, and Delitzsch.